Mladost is a district of Varna, Varna Municipality in Varna Province, Bulgaria. It is situated in the northwestern part of the city. Its population is just over 87,000 according to Census 2011.

Administrators 
Mayor: Yordanka Yunakova
Deputy mayor: Alexi Alexiev
Secretary: Natasha Milivoeva

External links
Satellite picture

Varna Municipality